The Bell Matriculation Higher Secondary School is a private school in Tamil Nadu, founded in 2000.

References

External links 
Bell School, Palayamkottai
Bell School's Orkut Link

Primary schools in Tamil Nadu
High schools and secondary schools in Tamil Nadu
Education in Tirunelveli district
Educational institutions established in 1992
1992 establishments in Tamil Nadu